The 2007 Bank of America 500 was a NASCAR Nextel Cup Series stock car race that was held on October 13, 2007, at Lowe's Motor Speedway in Concord, North Carolina. The race was the 31st race of the 2007 NASCAR Nextel Cup Series season, and the fifth race of the 2007 Chase for the Nextel Cup. It was the only Saturday night race in the Chase schedule for 2007.

Background
Ricky Rudd made his return to the  88 Yates Racing Ford after missing the previous five weeks due to a separated shoulder suffered in an accident during the Sharp AQUOS 500.
Dale Jarrett officially retired from full-time competition, and handed the wheel of the Michael Waltrip Racing No. 44 Toyota Camry to David Reutimann.

Qualifying
With a lap of 28.512 sec at a speed of 189.394 mph, Ryan Newman won his fifth pole of the 2007 season. Chase points leader Jeff Gordon started 4th right behind Hendrick Motorsports teammate Jimmie Johnson, who started 2nd on the outside pole. Defending winner Kasey Kahne started fifth, and Coke 600 winner Casey Mears started 9th.

Failed to Qualify: No. 44-Dale Jarrett, No. 78-Joe Nemechek, No. 83-Brian Vickers, No. 06-Sam Hornish Jr., No. 08-Carl Long, No. 27-Kirk Shelmerdine

Race
Like the previous Chase races at Dover, Kansas, and most recently at Talladega, a great portion of the 12 Chase drivers would have trouble. Many analysts expected defending champion Jimmie Johnson to walk away with another Charlotte victory, as he had won three consecutive 600's, including two sweeps in 2004 and 2005. He continued with his domination, leading 95 of 337 laps before an unexpected spin on lap 231 took him out of contention. His teammate, points leader Jeff Gordon picked up the lead, trading it with teammate Kyle Busch and Clint Bowyer. After an oil spill by Jeff Green, Gordon and Busch began experiencing fuel pickup problems. Fearing a wreck, owner Rick Hendrick told Kyle to race Gordon clean. Although he attempted a "bump and run" on Gordon, it gave Ryan Newman the opportunity to shoot back into the lead. Newman had victory in his sights until he surprisingly spun out with 3 to go, giving the lead back to Gordon, who had not finished a Lowe's race since 2004. However, Gordon would hold off Bowyer and Busch for his first Lowe's win since 1999.

Results

Top Ten Results: (Note: Chase drivers are in bold italics.)

References

Bank of America 500
Bank of America 500
NASCAR races at Charlotte Motor Speedway
October 2007 sports events in the United States